{{Infobox television
| image   = Miss Marple Title.jpg
| caption = Title card
| runtime = 120 minutes
| starring = Joan HicksonDavid HorovitchIan BrimbleJohn CastleGwen WatfordBarbara HicksChristopher GoodVarious others
| language = English
| country = United Kingdom
| channel = BBC1
| first_aired = 
| last_aired = 
| audio_format = Mono (1984–89)Stereo (1991–92)
| picture_format = 4:3 16 mm film Colour
| num_series = 3
| num_episodes = 12
| related = Agatha Christie's Marple}}Miss Marple is a British television series based on the Miss Marple murder mystery novels by Agatha Christie, starring Joan Hickson in the title role. It aired from 26 December 1984 to 27 December 1992 on BBC1. All twelve original Miss Marple Christie novels were dramatised. The adaptations were written by T. R. Bowen, Julia Jones, Alan Plater, Ken Taylor and Jill Hyem, and the series was produced by George Gallaccio. In addition to its availability on VHS and DVD, the series began to be released on Blu-ray Disc in October 2014, marking its 30th anniversary.

Background
Agatha Christie had never been very happy with most filmed adaptations of her works, and according to her grandson Mathew Pritchard, who handled her estate after her death, she "did not care much for television", either. Producer Pat Sandys of London Weekend Television first approached Pritchard and the Christie estate with a researched, detailed plan to film the novels Why Didn't They Ask Evans? and The Seven Dials Mystery in the early 1980s. Although indifferently treated by critics, the projects were popular with audiences and led to the filming of a number of short stories and the Tommy and Tuppence Beresford stories including The Secret Adversary and in the subsequent series Agatha Christie's Partners in Crime. With the success of that series, the BBC received approval to produce the stories of one of Christie's most famous detectives.

When the BBC was granted the screen rights to all twelve Miss Marple novels, the rights to three already co-existed and were set to expire at the end of 1988. The Mirror Crack'd From Side to Side had already been filmed and theatrically released in 1980 with Angela Lansbury in the role, and the same production company was in the process of filming A Caribbean Mystery and They Do It With Mirrors with Helen Hayes for television broadcast. Thus these three titles were the last to be dramatised under the BBC's agreement.

The adaptations are mainly true to the original novels. Joan Hickson, who played Miss Marple, was an octogenarian herself during most of the series' production. In 1980 she had appeared in a minor role of Mrs Rivington in Why Didn't They Ask Evans?. Decades before, she had appeared in a minor role in Murder, She Said, in which Margaret Rutherford played Miss Marple and interestingly referred to Hickson's character as the younger generation. Hickson had also appeared in a stage adaptation of the novel Appointment with Death in 1946, after which Christie sent Hickson a note that read, "I hope one day you will play my dear Miss Marple."

Characters
Regular characters
In addition to Miss Marple, there are two semi-regular characters in the series. The first is Inspector (later Superintendent) Slack, played by David Horovitch; the second is Constable (later Sergeant) Lake, played by Ian Brimble. Slack and Lake appear in five episodes: "The Body in the Library", "The Murder at the Vicarage", "4.50 From Paddington", "They Do It with Mirrors" and "The Mirror Crack'd from Side to Side". They are the official detectives, and both (particularly Slack) originally dislike and are exasperated by Miss Marple, her interference and her methods, but they eventually come to respect (and indeed, in the case of Lake, like) her.

Inspector/Superintendent Slack (David Horovitch) – Slack is the senior officer in charge of many cases. He has been described as "a man who has never striven more to contradict his name". Miss Marple describes him as having the "same personality as that of a diesel engine, most unappealing, but efficient". When Slack first met Miss Marple, her strange personality and her quirky methods caused him to think she was "batty", and thus took no notice of her. Slack especially disliked the fact that his superiors think highly of Miss Marple and consult her for advice (although he later ends up doing the same). Usually, Slack passes over Miss Marple's beliefs and dislikes her interfering, although he later comes to value her advice. In his final appearance, it is revealed that Slack has been promoted to Superintendent and appears to have grown wiser, even telling an officer to consult Miss Marple. In "They Do It with Mirrors" it is revealed that Slack has a secret passion for magic tricks, and secretly practises. Slack is featured in the novels The Murder at the Vicarage and The Body in the Library.
Constable/Sergeant Lake (Ian Brimble) – Lake is Slack's colleague and often works with him. He is also very bemused by Miss Marple, her quirky ways, her unusual methods and her claims of solving the cases based on trivial stories from her past. However, the difference was whilst Miss Marple annoyed Slack, Lake found her quite funny. By the time of They Do It With Mirrors, Lake is on friendly terms with Miss Marple and also reveals he has a young son called Adam. When Slack is promoted, Lake gets more roles in the art of criminal investigation but stays a Sergeant. Lake is featured in the novel They Do It with Mirrors.

Recurring characters
There are other recurring characters in Miss Marple:

 John Castle appears as Inspector Dermot Eric Craddock in "A Murder Is Announced" and "The Mirror Crack'd from Side to Side". Craddock was unknown to Miss Marple in the former story but had become her nephew by the latter. 
 Gwen Watford appears as Mrs Dolly Bantry in "The Body in the Library" and "The Mirror Crack'd from Side to Side". 
 Barbara Hicks and Christopher Good both appear as Miss Amanda Hartnell and Christopher Hawes in "The Murder at the Vicarage" and "The Mirror Crack'd from Side to Side" respectively. 
 Rhoda Lewis is village shopkeeper and postmistress Mrs Brogan in "A Pocketful of Rye", "4.50 from Paddington" and "The Mirror Crack'd from Side to Side".  
 Miss Marple's nephew Raymond West appears in "Sleeping Murder" (played by David McAlister) and in "A Caribbean Mystery" and "The Mirror Crack'd from Side to Side" (played by Trevor Bowen). 
 Jason Rafiel appears in "Nemesis" played by Frank Gatliff and "A Caribbean Mystery" played by Donald Pleasence (although the two episodes are set in the reverse order to which they aired).

Episodes

Production
BBC producer Guy Slater cast Joan Hickson as Miss Marple. The series was filmed beginning in 1983 in areas including Norfolk, Devon, Oxfordshire and Barbados.  The town of Nether Wallop in Hampshire doubled as Miss Marple's home village of St. Mary Mead. Slater was replaced by producer George Gallaccio, starting with the fourth film. The closing credits refer to the films being "A BBC-tv production in association with the Arts and Entertainment Network, USA and the Seven Network, Australia".

The first series consisted of four books adapted into ten episodes, each approximately 55–60 minutes in length and were broadcast between December 1984 and March 1985. The second series featured another four books, adapted as eight episodes, but the first two were combined into a 100-minute feature length episode shown on Christmas Day 1986, followed by the remaining six episodes at 50 minutes in length each in January and February 1987. The remaining four stories were broadcast as stand alone, 120-minute feature length episodes in the Christmas periods of 1987, 1989, 1991 and 1992. Eventually, with multiple repeats, all twelve stories were broadcast as both stand alone, feature length stories and broken into 50-55 minute single episodes.

Hickson vowed not to do another film after 1989's "A Caribbean Mystery" but was persuaded to return for the final two films in 1991 and 1992. "A Caribbean Mystery" was shot on location at the Coral Reef Hotel in Barbados, where Christie had stayed in her visit to the country, and which had been the inspiration for the setting of the novel. Owners Budge and Cynthia O'Hara, who still owned the hotel thirty years later, were the inspirations for the characters in the novel and were able to share a treasure trove of Christie memorabilia with the cast.

The evocative theme tune for the TV series was composed by Ken Howard and Alan Blaikley. The series opening titles featured paintings by renowned illustrator Paul Birkbeck of seemingly pleasant village life, darkened by suspicious looking characters and the shot of a murder victim behind a cricket sight screen. Gossipy women were made to look like they were hiding secrets, whilst the vicar appeared to be hiding in the shadows. For the first four adaptations, these paintings were black and white, but from "The Murder at the Vicarage" onwards, new colour drawings replaced them. The series closing credits featured a contemplative portrait of Hickson as Miss Marple in her trademark straw hat.

Adaptations of the books A Caribbean Mystery (1964) and Nemesis (1971) were filmed out of order. "Nemesis" was produced in February 1987 and "A Caribbean Mystery" in December 1989. The significance of this is the character Jason Rafiel, who is introduced in A Caribbean Mystery and in Nemesis has died and made a request of Miss Marple to solve a years-old mystery. Because the two episodes were filmed out of order, viewers of "Nemesis" are clueless as to what part Jason Rafiel played in Miss Marple's life until they watch "A Caribbean Mystery". Rafiel was portrayed by Frank Gatliff in "Nemesis", and by Donald Pleasence in "A Caribbean Mystery".

The character of Inspector Craddock presents another inconsistency in the series. The character is clearly unknown to Miss Marple in "A Murder is Announced" but in his second appearance in "The Mirror Crack'd from Side to Side", Craddock is Miss Marple's nephew.

All of the episodes take place in the 1950s. "The Murder at the Vicarage" is set in 1954, according to a sign about money being raised for the church fund. This takes place after the events of "The Body in the Library", which Miss Marple relates briefly when describing how she first came across Inspector Slack. "Nemesis" is set in 1955 or 1956 as it is said to be seven or eight years after the murder of the story which happened in 1948, according to the dates on the victim's gravestone. "A Caribbean Mystery" is set prior to this. "At Bertram's Hotel" is set relatively shortly after the launch of ITV (in September 1955), so probably in 1956 (though it also shows the London Hilton completed, which suggests the early 1960s), and "4.50 from Paddington" is set in 1957, during the launch of Sputnik.

Reception
The first episode was enthusiastically received by critics. The Times said "once hooked, you won't be able to turn off", and The Sun said it was a series "with pulling power and real class". For episode two, "The Moving Finger", The Daily Telegraph stated "Once again Guy Slater's production is built around the brilliant performance of Joan Hickson, behind whose faded blue eyes and spinsterish sibilants, the wheels of detective intelligence can be seen positively whirring around. The enterprise is impeccably cast, beautifully ordered, lovingly photographed." Reviews for subsequent films were equally positive.

Alan McKee, of the Museum of Broadcast Communications, reviews the series as "a good example of a 'heritage' production", popular in the 1980s. It combines new Victorianism in moral standards and a sanitised version of England's past. Mostly set in a rural past, English architecture and country mansion houses are featured. Like many BBC programmes, production values are impeccable and costumes, houses and decor, cars, hairstyles and make-up could all be described as "sumptuous".

McKee also praises the series for "being as faithful as possible to the source material. Miss Marple does not chase the villains herself as Margaret Rutherford does in her film series, nor are the titles of the books altered to make them more sensational."

As for Hickson personally, she is frequently described as the "definitive" Miss Marple as Christie would have pictured her, and Hickson personally credited in large part the bestowal of an OBE award to the role, as Queen Elizabeth II was a fan of the series and Hickson's performance.

Hickson was twice nominated for the British Academy Television Award for Best Actress during the series' run. Firstly in 1987 for Murder at the Vicarage and then again in 1988 for Nemesis.

Other countries
All 12 episodes were shown in the United States on the PBS Mystery! series. Miss Marple was also seen in over 30 countries, including Spain, the former Soviet Union and China.

Home mediaMiss Marple was first released in DVD in the UK (Region 2) in 2000. A complete box set of all 12 stories was released in 2005 by 2 Entertain Video. In North America (Region 1), episodes were first released in 2001.

In summer 2009, the Sunday edition of the Greek newspaper Kathimerini was offering to its readers DVDs (one per week) of the series.

In January 2010, the Daily Mail offered six DVDs (from 2 Entertain Video) each with a complete episode from series. The episodes in the DVD giveaway offer were "The Murder at the Vicarage", "Sleeping Murder", "At Bertram's Hotel", "Nemesis", "A Caribbean Mystery", and "They Do It with Mirrors".

To mark the 30th anniversary of the series, BBC Home Entertainment fully remastered the series for release on DVD and, for the first time, on Blu-ray Disc.  The series was released in three volumes. Miss Marple: Volume One, released on 28 October 2014, included the episodes "The Body in the Library", "A Murder Is Announced", "The Moving Finger," and "Murder at the Vicarage" and the first part of the three-part documentary special, "A Very British Murder, Part 1: A New Taste for Blood".  Miss Marple: Volume Two, released on 31 March 2015, included the episodes "They Do It with Mirrors", "The Mirror Crack’d from Side to Side", "4.50 from Paddington", and "A Pocketful of Rye" along with the bonus material "A Very British Murder, Part 2: Detection Most Ingenious". Miss Marple: Volume Three,'' released on 9 June 2015, included the episodes "A Caribbean Mystery",  "At Bertram’s Hotel", " Sleeping Murder", and "Nemesis" along with the bonus material "A Very British Murder, Part 3: The Golden Age".

References

External links
Miss Marple at the British Film Institute Screen Online

1984 British television series debuts
1992 British television series endings
BBC television dramas
Miss Marple
English-language television shows
1980s British drama television series
1990s British drama television series
Period television series
Television shows based on works by Agatha Christie
British crime drama television series
BBC mystery television shows
Television series set in the 1940s
Television series set in the 1950s
British detective television series
Television series by BBC Studios